American Troubadour is a 1997 British 2-CD set that presented a portrait of singer-songwriter Phil Ochs' later career, featuring selections from each of the five albums he recorded for A&M Records, from various non-album single sides and from a performance Ochs gave on March 13, 1969, in Vancouver, British Columbia. It is notable for the inclusion of Ochs' post-1970 single sides, otherwise unavailable on compact disc and for the inclusion of a cover of Chuck Berry's "School Days", a previously unavailable outtake from Ochs' infamous March 27, 1970, concert at Carnegie Hall.

Track listing

Disc One
 All songs by Phil Ochs.
 Cross My Heart
 Flower Lady
 Outside of a Small Circle of Friends
 Pleasures of the Harbor (live)
 Crucifixion
 Tape From California
 White Boots Marching in a Yellow Land
 Half A Century High
 Joe Hill
 The War Is Over
 William Butler Yeats Visits Lincoln Park And Escapes Unscathed
 Here's to the State of Richard Nixon (live)
 The Scorpion Departs But Never Returns
 Doesn't Lenny Live Here Anymore
 Rehearsals for Retirement

Disc Two
 All songs by Phil Ochs, except where noted.
 I Kill Therefore I Am
 The Bells (Edgar Allan Poe and Phil Ochs)
 The Highwayman (Alfred Noyes and Phil Ochs)
 Another Age
 There But For Fortune
 One Way Ticket Home
 Jim Dean of Indiana
 My Kingdom For A Car
 Gas Station Women
 Chords of Fame
 No More Songs
 Mona Lisa (live) (Jay Livingston and Ray Evans)
 I Ain't Marching Anymore (live)
 School Days (live) (Chuck Berry)
 The Power and the Glory
 Kansas City Bomber
 Bwatue (Phil Ochs and Dijiba-Bukasa)
 Niko Mchumba Ngombe (Phil Ochs and Dijiba-Bukasa)
 Changes (live)

Sources

Disc One
 Tracks 1-3 and 5 from Pleasures of the Harbor (1967)
 Track 4 from Gunfight at Carnegie Hall (recorded 1970, released 1975)
 Tracks 6-10 from Tape from California (1968)
 Tracks 11 and 13-15 from Rehearsals for Retirement (1969)
 Track 12 from the 1974 single.

Disc Two
 Track 1 from Rehearsals for Retirement (1969)
 Tracks 2-5 and 19 from There and Now: Live in Vancouver 1968 (sic) (recorded March 13, 1969, released 1991)
 Tracks 6-11 from Greatest Hits (1970)
 Tracks 12-13 from Gunfight at Carnegie Hall (recorded 1970, released 1975)
 Track 14 previously unreleased.
 Track 15 from the 1974 single.
 Track 16 from the 1973 single.
 Tracks 17-18 from the 1973 single.

References

Phil Ochs compilation albums
1997 compilation albums
Albums produced by Van Dyke Parks
A&M Records compilation albums